The First Battle of Dongola was a battle between early Arab-Muslim forces of the Rashidun Caliphate and the Nubian-Christian forces of the Kingdom of Makuria in 642. The battle, which resulted in a Makurian  victory, halted Arab incursions into Nubia and set the tone for an atmosphere of hostility between the two cultures until the culmination of the Second Battle of Dongola in 652.

Background
In the 6th century the area that had once been under the domination of the Kingdom of Kush converted to Christianity. It included the kingdoms of Alodia, Makuria and Nobatia, which rested on Egypt's southern border. Over a century later, the religion of Islam united the nomadic Arab tribes into an expanding military and political force by 632. In 640, the military leader 'Amr ibn al-'As conquered Egypt from the Byzantine Empire. To consolidate Muslim control over Egypt, it was inevitable to secure its western and southern borders. Amr accordingly sent expeditions to Byzantine North Africa and Makuria's Nubia.

Battle
In 642, 'Amr ibn al-'As sent a column of 20,000 horsemen under his cousin Uqba ibn Nafi against Makuria. They managed to get as far as Dongola, the capital of Makuria. However, in a rare turn of events, the Arab forces were beaten back.

According to historian Al-Baladhuri, the Muslims found that the Nubians fought strongly and met them with showers of arrows. The majority of the Arab forces returned with wounded and blinded eyes. It was thus that the Nubians were called 'the pupil smiters'. Al-Baladhuri also states, quoting from one of his sources that went to Nubia twice during the rule of `Umar ibn al-Khattab.
"One day they came out against us and formed a line; we wanted to use swords, but we were not able to, and they shot at us and put out eyes to the number of one hundred and fifty."

The Nubian victory at Dongola was one of the Rashidun Caliphate's rare defeats during the mid-7th century. With their archers' deadly accuracy plus their own experienced cavalry forces, Makuria was able to shake the Amr's confidence enough for him to withdraw his forces from Nubia.

Arab withdrawal from Nubia
Arab sources claim that the expedition into Nubia was not a Muslim defeat while at the same time acknowledging it was not a success. The expedition into Nubia, as well as the more successful expedition into Byzantine North Africa, were undertaken by 'Amr ibn al-'As on his own accord. He believed that they would be easy victories and would inform the caliph after the conquests.

The Arab sources also make it clear there were no pitched battles in Nubia. Yet, they do mention an encounter whereupon Uqba ibn Nafi and his forces happened upon a concentration of Nubians that promptly gave battle before the Muslims could attack. In the ensuing engagement, he claims 150 Muslims lost an eye.

Arab sources lend more credit to Nubian guerrilla tactics than a single decisive engagement. They claim that the Nubians would call out to their Muslim adversaries from afar where they would like their arrow wound. The Muslims would jokingly respond, and the arrow would strike them there invariably. This statement, along with a claim that Nubian horsemen were superior to Muslim cavalry in hit-and-run tactics, was used to support their position that the Nubians were besting them in skirmishes and not all-out battles.

Regardless of the situation, Uqba ibn Nafi was unable to succeed with his expedition and wrote back to his cousin that he could not win against such tactics and that Nubia was a very poor land with no treasure worth fighting for. Uqba may not have been exaggerating, since Nubia is surrounded by formidable deserts. Upon receiving this news, Amr bin al-As asked his cousin to withdraw, which he did.

Aftermath
Al-Baladhuri states 'Amr decided to withdraw his forces for two principal reasons: that there was little treasure to be had, and that the Nubian military proved considerable. Thus, it was thought better to make peace. However; he was unwilling to stop campaigning elsewhere, and peace between Muslim Egypt and Christian Makuria only really materialized upon the succession of Abdullah Ibn Sa'ad in 645. This peace would last until the Second Battle of Dongola, whose outcome would result in one of the longest peace treaties in recorded history.

See also
Kingdom of Makuria
Rashidun Caliphate
Amr ibn al-A'as

References

Sources

Dongola
Kingdom of Makuria
Military history of Africa
642
7th century in Africa
Dongola
Military history of Sudan